"Félicie aussi" is a 1939 song performed by Fernandel. Of the 300 songs he sang on stage during his career, it is undoubtedly his most famous.

Writing and composition 
The song was written by Albert Willemetz (who penned the lyrics for such songs as Maurice Chevalier's "Valentine" and Mistinguett's "C'est vrai") and Charles-Louis Pothier and composed by Casimir Oberfeld.

The song is based on appreciation of the adverb "aussi" ("too"):

Charts

References 

1939 songs
French songs
Songs with lyrics by Albert Willemetz
Songs with music by Casimir Oberfeld
Comedy songs
Fernandel songs